Parenion is a genus of braconid wasps in the family Braconidae. There are at least three described species in Parenion, found in Australasia.

Species
These three species belong to the genus Parenion:
 Parenion beelaronga Austin & Dangerfield, 1992 (Australia)
 Parenion bootha Austin & Dangerfield, 1992 (Australia)
 Parenion kokodana (Wilkinson, 1936) (Australia, Papua New Guinea)

References

Microgastrinae